Young Women's Christian Association of Plainfield and North Plainfield is a historic building in Plainfield, Union County, New Jersey, United States.

It was built in 1924 and as the name suggests intended to serve young women of both Plainfield and North Plainfield. The building was added to the National Register of Historic Places in 1998.

See also
National Register of Historic Places listings in Union County, New Jersey

References

External links
YWCA of Central New Jersey

Properties of religious function on the National Register of Historic Places in New Jersey
Religious buildings and structures completed in 1924
Buildings and structures in Union County, New Jersey
YWCA buildings
Clubhouses in New Jersey
National Register of Historic Places in Union County, New Jersey
New Jersey Register of Historic Places
Plainfield, New Jersey
History of women in New Jersey